The Molise regional election of 1985 took place on 12 May 1985.

Events
Christian Democracy was by far the largest party, gaining more than three times the share of vote of the Italian Communist Party, which came distantly second.

After the election Christian Democrat Paolo Nuvoli was elected President of the Region. In 1988 Nuvoli was replaced by fellow Christian Democrat Ferdinando Di Laura Frattura.

Results

Source: Ministry of the Interior

Elections in Molise
1985 elections in Italy
May 1985 events in Europe